Harry Lee "Spider" Coe (June 25, 1885 – April 1977) was an American athlete.  He competed in the 1908 Summer Olympics in London.  He competed in intercollegiate track for the University of Michigan. He died in Seattle, Washington.

In 1908 he was eliminated in the semi-finals of the 400 metre hurdles competition after finishing third in his heat.

Coe placed second in his initial semifinal heat of the 1500 metres, clocking in at 4:09.2, not far behind heat winner Ernest Loney at 4:08.4.  Coe did not advance to the final.

In the 800 metres, Coe finished second in his semifinal heat as well and did not advance to the final.  He finished two yards behind eventual silver medalist Emilio Lunghi, at 1:57.2.

References

Sources
 profile
 
 
 

1885 births
1977 deaths
American male middle-distance runners
American male hurdlers
Olympic track and field athletes of the United States
Athletes (track and field) at the 1908 Summer Olympics
Michigan Wolverines men's track and field athletes